Nerekhta may refer to:
Nerekhta UGV
Nerekhta Urban Settlement, a municipal formation within Nerekhtsky Municipal District into which the town of oblast significance of Nerekhta, Russia is incorporated
Nerekhta (inhabited locality), several inhabited localities in Russia
Nerekhta (river), a river in Vladimir Oblast, Russia